Anne-Christine Hladky-Hennion (born 1965) is a French researcher in acoustic metamaterials. She is a director of research for the French National Centre for Scientific Research (CNRS), and scientific deputy director of the CNRS  (INSIS).

Education and career
Hladky is originally from Lille, where she was born in 1965. After earning a diploma in 1987 from the Institut supérieur de l'électronique et du numérique in Lille, she continued her education at the Lille University of Science and Technology, where she earned a doctorate in 1990, in materials science. Her doctoral dissertation, Application de la méthode des éléments finis à la modélisation de structures périodiques utilisées en acoustique, was supervised by Jean-Noël Decarpigny.

She joined CNRS in 1992, and became a director of research in 2015.

Recognition
Hladky was the 1990 winner of the Young Researcher Prize of the French Acoustical Society. In 2018 she received the CNRS Silver Medal.

References

1965 births
Living people
Scientists from Lille
French materials scientists
Women materials scientists and engineers
Metamaterials scientists
Research directors of the French National Centre for Scientific Research